Oliver Bromby (born 30 March 1998) is an English sprinter competing primarily in the 100 metres. He won a silver medal at the 2019 European U23 Championships.

International competitions

1Did not finish in the final

Personal bests
Outdoor
100 metres – 10.22 (+1.5 m/s, Lee Valley 2019)
200 metres – 21.32 (+1.5 m/s, Eton 2015)

Indoor
60 metres – 6.63 (Ostrava, Czech Republic 2020)
200 metres – 21.36 (Sheffield 1016)

References

1998 births
Living people
English male sprinters
British male sprinters